The IKCO Dena is a family car manufactured by the Iran Khodro (IKCO) auto company; it was unveiled in April 2011, but mass-production only began in 2015. Its price range will be between USD$12,000 and USD$13,000, depending on the specific model and accessories. Dena will replace the IKCO Samand in non-domestic markets after the manufacturer starts mass production.

IKCO Dena is named after the peak Dena in the Zagros Mountains, 35 km north-west of Yasuj in western Iran. IKCO chose this name to identify the car as a symbol of technological improvement and the lofty height of the company's aspirations.

Design and development
The project was outlined in March 2010 and began operating in February 2011, which is considered a record in car production process according to IKCO. Dena was first unveiled in April 2011. At the time, it was initially scheduled to hit the Iranian markets in April 2012. The IKCO is supposed to reveal the turbocharged version of Dena in 2020.

The Dena is built on the IKCO Samand platform, measuring same in width and only 50 millimeters apart in length. Three different locally produced engines based on Peugeot's TU5JP4 will be available; EF7 NA, Dena ELX EF7 and EF7 TC, all manual gearbox. Side airbags will be optional while front airbags are included, ABS will also be standard on all models.

By 2015, mass-production of the Dena had commenced with 8,437 units being produced for the first seven months of 2015, or up to July 2015 which corresponds to Tir 1394 in the Persian calendar. Comparatively, only 48 units of the Dena were produced for the whole of 1393 SH. Additionally, 30,472 units of the older Samand and 7,332 units of the smaller Runna have also been produced in the first seven months of 2015.

See also
 IKCO Runna
 Iran Khodro
 Iranian automobile industry

References

External links

 Official IKCO Dena page in English

Cars of Iran
Dena
Front-wheel-drive vehicles
2010s cars
Mid-size cars
Sedans
Cars introduced in 2011